Nina Sergeevna Shatskaya (16 March 1940 – 23 May 2021) was a Soviet and Russian actress, Merited Artist of the Russian Federation (2008). She was known for playing in the films Welcome, or No Trespassing, A Man Before His Time and Visit to Minotaur.

Biography
In 1963 she graduated from the Russian Institute of Theatre Arts. From 1964 to 1993 she was an actress of the Taganka Theatre.

Shatskaya died on 23 May 2021, aged 81, a day after being diagnosed with COVID-19 during the COVID-19 pandemic in Russia.

Personal life
 First husband (1963–1977): Valeri Zolotukhin (1941–2013), actor. Son — Denis (born 1969), orthodox priest.
 Second husband (1982–2003): Leonid Filatov (1946–2003), actor.

References

External links
 

20th-century Russian actresses
Russian film actresses
Soviet actresses
Soviet film actresses
1940 births
2021 deaths
Deaths from the COVID-19 pandemic in Russia
Actresses from Moscow
Russian Academy of Theatre Arts alumni
Honored Artists of the Russian Federation